Gottlob Ferdinand Maximilian Gottfried von Schenkendorf (11 December 1783 in Tilsit in East Prussia – 11 December 1817 in Koblenz) was a German poet, born in Tilsit and educated at Königsberg. During the War of Liberation, in which he took an active part, Schenkendorf was associated with Arndt and Körner in the writing of patriotic songs.  His poems were published as Gedichte (1815), Poetischer Nachlass (1832), and Sämtliche Gedichte (1837; fifth edition, 1878). Some of his poems were set to music by lieder composer Pauline Volkstein.  For his Life, consult Hagen (Berlin, 1863); Knaake (Tilsit, 1890); E. von Klein, M. von Schenkendorf (Vienna, 1908).

Gallery

References

External links

1783 births
1817 deaths
People from Tilsit
German songwriters
German poets
People from East Prussia
University of Königsberg alumni
German military personnel of the Napoleonic Wars
19th-century German musicians